"Flow On (New Symphony)" is the fifth and final single released from the Lords of the Underground's debut album, Here Come the Lords. The original song was produced by Marley Marl and featured verses from the group's affiliates, Kid Deleon and Sah-B, while Pete Rock contributed a remix of the song. "Flow On" peaked at 36 on the Hot Rap Singles and sampled "Float On" by The Floaters.

Single track listing

A-Side
"Flow On (New Symphony)" (Pete Rock Remix)- 4:28
"Flow On (New Symphony)" (Pete Rock TV Mix)- 4:28
"Flow On (New Symphony)" (Flo-apella)- 4:28

B-Side
"Lord's Prayer" (Album Mix)-  4:30
"Flow On (New Symphony)" (Rumblin' Remix)- 4:08
"Flow On (New Symphony)" (Rumblin' TV Mix)- 4:08
"Flow On (New Symphony)" (Rumbapella)- 4:01

Charts

1994 singles
Lords of the Underground songs
1993 songs
Song recordings produced by Marley Marl
Elektra Records singles